Christine Decodts (born 19 May 1966) is a French politician from the miscellaneous centre (Ensemble) who has represented Nord's 13th constituency in the National Assembly since 2022.

References 

Living people
1981 births
Deputies of the 16th National Assembly of the French Fifth Republic
21st-century French women politicians
Women members of the National Assembly (France)

La République En Marche! politicians
Members of Parliament for Nord
People from Dunkirk